Huseyn Mursalov (born 12 July 2002) is an Azerbaijani footballer who plays as a defender for Gabala in the Azerbaijan Premier League.

Club career
On 31 October 2021, Mursalov made his debut in the Azerbaijan Premier League for Gabala match against Sabah.

Career statistics

Club

References

External links
 

2002 births
Living people
Association football defenders
Azerbaijan youth international footballers
Azerbaijan under-21 international footballers
Azerbaijani footballers
Azerbaijan Premier League players
Gabala FC players